Cymindis punctifera is a species of ground beetle in the subfamily Harpalinae. It was described by John Lawrence LeConte in 1884.

References

punctifera
Beetles described in 1884